Maize is a city in Sedgwick County, Kansas, United States, and a suburb of Wichita.  As of the 2020 census, the population of the city was 5,735.  The name Maize, derived from a Native American word for "corn", was named because it is located within the Corn Belt.

History
The Maize Town Company, led by N. F. Neiderlander, founded Maize in 1886 at the first stop outside of Wichita on the Wichita and Colorado Railway. The post office opened that same year as did the town's first church, having relocated from nearby. Maize's first school opened in 1887; its first newspaper opened in 1895. Maize State Bank, the town's first financial institution, opened in 1901, and, by 1908, a business community had emerged. In 1915, the Maize Town Company dissolved, and Maize was incorporated as a city.

Several natural disasters struck Maize in the 1930s and 1940s, including the Dust Bowl in 1934–35, a plague of grasshoppers in 1936, and a flood in 1944.

Maize began to grow rapidly in 1950, more than doubling in size by 1956. This growth has continued, accelerating in recent years as Wichita has expanded to the northwest, and transformed Maize into a suburb.

Geography
Maize is located at  (37.779178, -97.467267) at an elevation of 1,348 feet (411 m). Located in south-central Kansas, Maize is on K-96 immediately northwest of Wichita.

Demographics

Maize is part of the Wichita, KS Metropolitan Statistical Area.

2010 census
As of the census of 2010, there were 3,420 people, 1,172 households, and 942 families living in the city. The racial makeup of the city was 91.3% White, 1.5% African American, 1.1% Native American, 1.1% Asian, 0.1% Pacific Islander, 1.3% from other races, and 3.6% from two or more races. Hispanic or Latino of any race were 7.4% of the population.

There were 1,172 households, of which 49.4% had children under the age of 18 living with them, 59.4% were married couples living together, 15.2% had a female householder with no husband present, 5.8% had a male householder with no wife present, and 19.6% were non-families. 17.2% of all households were made up of individuals, and 7.4% had someone living alone who was 65 years of age or older. The average household size was 2.92 and the average family size was 3.28.

The median age in the city was 30.7 years. 34.1% of residents were under the age of 18; 7.6% were between the ages of 18 and 24; 27.7% were from 25 to 44; 21.8% were from 45 to 64; and 8.8% were 65 years of age or older. The gender makeup of the city was 48.6% male and 51.4% female.

2000 census
As of the census of 2000, there were 1,868 people, 632 households, and 523 families living in the city. The racial makeup of the city was 93.47% White, 0.96% African American, 1.23% Native American, 0.32% Asian, 0.91% from other races, and 3.10% from two or more races. Hispanic or Latino of any race were 2.62% of the population.

There were 632 households, out of which 49.4% had children under the age of 18 living with them, 66.6% were married couples living together, 11.4% had a female householder with no husband present, and 17.2% were non-families. 15.7% of all households were made up of individuals, and 6.0% had someone living alone who was 65 years of age or older.  The average household size was 2.96 and the average family size was 3.28.

In the city, the population was spread out, with 34.4% under the age of 18, 8.0% from 18 to 24, 30.7% from 25 to 44, 19.9% from 45 to 64, and 7.1% who were 65 years of age or older.  The median age was 30 years. For every 100 females, there were 100.4 males.  For every 100 females age 18 and over, there were 97.1 males.

The median income for a household in the city was $51,845, and the median income for a family was $53,365. Males had a median income of $41,653 versus $25,817 for females. The per capita income for the city was $18,803.  About 1.9% of families and 3.0% of the population were below the poverty line, including 4.4% of those under age 18 and 1.4% of those age 65 or over.

Government
Maize has a mayor-council-administrator form of government. The city council consists of the mayor and five members who serve part-time.  The mayor is elected to a four-year term while terms for council members are staggered such that two members are up for election every two years.

Education

Primary and secondary education
Maize USD 266 public school district operates fourteen schools in and around the city:
 Maize High School (9-12)
 Maize South High School (9-12)
 Complete High School Maize (9-12), alternative school
 Maize Career Academy (9-12)
 Maize South Middle School (7-8)
 Maize Middle School (7-8)
 Maize South Intermediate School (5-6)
 Maize Intermediate School (5-6)
 Pray-Woodman Elementary School (2-5)
 Maize South Elementary School (2-5)
 Maize Central Elementary School (K-5)
 Maize Elementary School (K-1)
 Vermillion Elementary School 
 Early Childhood Center (PreK)

Infrastructure

Transportation
K-96 runs northwest-southeast through the middle of the city, but remains outside of the official city limits. Questions of jurisdictional responsibility relating to highway and infrastructure as well as law enforcement authority have long been an issue of misunderstanding amongst city leaders. City police have no police authority on K-96 unless operating under a deputy sheriff commission granted under the authority of the Sedgwick County Sheriff. Currently, sheriff’s deputies and members of the Kansas Highway Patrol are tasked with all law enforcement and investigative responsibility.

The Hutchinson line of the Kansas and Oklahoma Railroad runs southeast–northwest through Maize.

Maize Airport is a privately owned, public-use airport located two nautical miles (2.3 mi, 3.7 km) southeast of the central business district of Maize.

Notable people
Notable individuals who were born in and/or have lived in Maize include:
 Nancy Kassebaum (1932- ), U.S. Senator from Kansas
 Richard Kassebaum (1960-2008), documentary filmmaker
 Miles Ukaoma (1992-), Olympian

References

Further reading

External links

 City of Maize
 Maize - Directory of Public Officials
 Maize city map, KDOT

Cities in Kansas
Cities in Sedgwick County, Kansas
Wichita, KS Metropolitan Statistical Area
Populated places established in 1886
1886 establishments in Kansas